The following is a list of all team-to-team transactions that have occurred in the National Hockey League (NHL) during the 1937–38 NHL season. It lists which team each player has been traded to and for which player(s) or other consideration(s), if applicable.

Transactions

References

Transactions
National Hockey League transactions